Detainment is a 2018 Irish short drama film written and directed by Vincent Lambe, about the murder of James Bulger. It was nominated for the Best Live Action Short Film at the 91st Academy Awards.

Plot
A re-enactment partially altered for dramatic purposes of the real-life event of what happened to James Bulger shows 10-year-old boys Jon Venables and Robert Thompson each asked questions in different Liverpool police stations about what happened to James. They constantly blame each other, and flashbacks are shown of their time together with James. Eventually, they are found guilty of murdering James, and both boys are arrested offscreen.

Cast
 Ely Solan as Jon Venables
 Leon Hughes as Robert Thompson
 Will O'Connell as Detective Dale
 David Ryan as Detective Scott
 Tara Breathnach as Susan Venables
 Killian Sheridan as Neil Venables
 Kathy Monahan as Ann Thompson
 Morgan C. Jones as Detective Roberts
 Caleb Mason as James Bulger
 Martin Phillips as Laurence Lee (Jon Venables’ solicitor)
 Tom Pigot as Dominic Lloyd (Robert Thompson’s solicitor)
 Alan Buckley as Robert Thompson’s social worker
 Brian Fortune as Detective Jacobs

Reception
Detainment received generally positive reviews from critics with many praising the performances, particularly Solan's, and the handling of its subject matter, although many have criticised Lambe's decision to make the film without the consent of James Bulger's family. In January 2019, it was nominated for the Best Live Action Short Film at the 91st Academy Awards. Denise Fergus, the mother of James Bulger, stated that she was "disgusted and upset" by the film and its subsequent nomination because the film was made without contacting her family. She had previously circulated a petition to have it removed from Oscar consideration, which drew more than 227,000 signatures by 29 January 2019, and wrote to the film's director Vincent Lambe to withdraw it from the Oscars. Lambe said that he would not be doing so, saying "It's like saying we should burn every copy of it. I think it would defeat the purpose of making the film."

Malcolm Stevens, who oversaw the detention of the killers as the former Home Secretary's professional adviser, defended the making of the film in an editorial, saying that it raised questions regarding the treatment of young offenders which he felt "successive governments have striven to avoid".

References

External links
 

2018 drama films
2018 films
2018 short films
2010s historical drama films
British historical drama films
Drama films based on actual events
English-language Irish films
Films set in 1993
Irish historical drama films
Irish short films
2010s English-language films
2010s British films